The Instituto Nacional Meteorologia e Hidrologia (INAMHI) is the national meteorological agency of Ecuador.

INAMHI's functions are: 
 Planning, a?
directing and overseeing meteorological and hydrological activities in the country, in coordination with other institutions and agencies;
 Developing systems and rules governing the programs of meteorology and hydrology in accordance with national needs;
 Establishing, operating and maintaining the infrastructure necessary for a basic hydrometeorological compliance program;
 Obtaining, collecting, examining, processing, publishing and disseminating data, information and forecasts necessary for the detailed and comprehensive knowledge of weather, climate and hydrological characteristics of the whole of maritime and continental Ecuador;
 Conducting studies and researching hydrometeorological requests for state agencies or individuals;
 Educating and training staff to technical and professional expertise in the fields of meteorology and hydrology, and
 Promoting scientific research in meteorology and hydrology.

Research conducted by the INAMHI includes studying the hydrology of the Ecuadorian Amazon basin.

References

External links
 Official WWW site

Science and technology in Ecuador
Hydrology organizations
Government of Ecuador
Governmental meteorological agencies in South America